The Rural Municipality of Victory No. 226 is a rural municipality (RM) in the Canadian province of Saskatchewan within Census Division No. 7 and  Division No. 3.

History 

The RM of Victory No. 226 incorporated as a rural municipality on December 8, 1919. The first settlers to the area came in the early 1900s. The community of Demaine was established by the summer of 1908 by a band of settlers who hauled supplies from the Riverhurst area to the east, and across the South Saskatchewan River. Originally all supplies had to be moved from other areas as the settlements were being established.

As with current life in rural municipality the first settlers to the area were farmers who began to grow grain. They farmed with teams of oxen and mules prior to the invention of modern-day farming machinery. Eventually two larger settlements were established. These turned into the Village of Beechy and the Organized Hamlet of Demaine.

Geography 
Victory No. 226 is bordered by King George No. 256 in the north, Canaan No. 225 in the east, Lake Diefenbaker, which is part of the South Saskatchewan River in the south, and Lacadena No. 228 in the west. With wide open spaces and small rolling hills the land of Victory No. 226 comprises fertile soil perfect for grain farming. Naturally, much of the landscape is covered by grain farming operations.

Communities and localities 
The following urban municipalities are surrounded by the RM.

Villages
Beechy

The following unincorporated communities are within the RM.

Organized hamlets
Demaine

Climate 
The rural municipality follows the typical climate and weather patterns of the southern half of Saskatchewan by having harsh, dry cold winters, and warm summers.

Demographics 

Economy 
Its economy is based on agriculture, primarily grain farming with livestock ranching as well.

Government 
The RM of Victory No. 226 is governed by an elected municipal council and an appointed administrator that meets on the first Tuesday of every month. The reeve of the RM is Lee Galbraith while the administrator is Diane Watt. The RM's office is located in Beechy.

Notable people 
 Elwin Hermanson - politician
 Herbert Swan - former Speaker of the Legislative Assembly of Saskatchewan (1982–1986)

References 

Victory